Kondopozhsky (masculine), Kondopozhskaya (feminine), or Kondopozhskoye (neuter) may refer to:
Kondopozhsky District, a district of the Republic of Karelia, Russia
Kondopozhskoye Urban Settlement, a municipal formation which the town of Kondopoga and three rural localities in Kondopozhsky District of the Republic of Karelia, Russia are incorporated as